Gold Fields Limited (formerly The Gold Fields of South Africa) is one of the world's largest gold mining firms. Headquartered in Johannesburg, South Africa, the company is listed on both the Johannesburg Stock Exchange (JSE) and the New York Stock Exchange (NYSE). The firm was formed in 1998 with the amalgamation of the gold assets of Gold Fields of South Africa Limited and Gencor Limited. The company traces its roots back to 1887, when Cecil Rhodes founded Gold Fields of South Africa Limited. As of 2019, Gold Field was the world's eighth-largest producer of gold.

The company owns and operates mines in South Africa, Ghana, Australia and Peru. Growth efforts are focused mainly in the regions where it currently operates, and are mainly driven through brownfields exploration on its existing land positions and through mergers and acquisitions in the same regions.

Gold Fields' chairperson is Cheryl Carolus, and the CEO is Chris Griffith.

Board of directors
 Chairperson – Cheryl Carolus

Executive directors
 Chief executive officer (CEO) – Chris Griffith
 Chief financial officer (CFO) – Paul Schmidt

Operations

Australia
 Agnew Gold Mine
 St Ives Gold Mine
 Granny Smith Gold Mine
 Gruyere Gold Mine
 All the mines are located in Western Australia

Ghana
 Tarkwa Gold Mine
 4 km west of the town of Tarkwa
 Damang Gold Mine
 30 km north of the neighbouring Tarkwa Gold Mine
 45% of the Asanko Gold Mine

Peru

 Cerro Corona Gold Mine
 The Cerro Corona Mine in Peru is in the highest part of the western Cordillera of the Andes Mountains in the north of the country.

South Africa
 South Deep Gold Mine

In 2012, Gold Fields Limited unbundled its subsidiary, GFI Mining South Africa Proprietary Limited ("GFIMSA"), which was then renamed Sibanye Gold Limited ("Sibanye Gold"), and consisted of the KDC (formerly Kloof) and Beatrix mines, as well as an array of support service entities in South Africa. The three mines transferred from Gold Fields to Sibanye, later Sibanye-Stillwater, were:

 Beatrix gold mine
 Kloof gold mine 
 Driefontein gold mine

Environment 
In October 2001 a tailings dam ruptured at the company's Tarkwa Gold Mine in Ghana resulting in thousands of cubic metres of mine waste water spilling into the Asuman River and resulting in the death of significant marine life. While acknowledging the cyanide spill the company stated at the time that the spill did not affect human health or safety.

A further incident occurred in 2003 when water from an abandoned underground mine shaft, again at the company's Tarkwa Gold Mine, was identified as having seeped into the Asuman River sparking further fears of contamination.

In July 2012 the company was directed by the Ghana Environmental Protection Agency to halt a gold-recovery plant at the Tarkwa Gold Mine because water discharged from the site required additional treatment.

Bibliography
 Gold Fields: A Centenary Portrait by Paul Johnson. Many black and white, colour plates of personnel and topography. Includes an image of Guy Carleton Jones, and refers to Consolidated Gold Fields and its subsidiary companies.

References

External links
 
 

 
Gold mining companies of South Africa
Companies based in Johannesburg
Companies listed on the New York Stock Exchange
Companies listed on the Johannesburg Stock Exchange